Dreams is a compilation album by the Allman Brothers Band.  Packaged as a box set of four CDs or six LPs, it was released on June 20, 1989.

Dreams is a collection of recordings taken from not only the Allman Brothers Band, but also from throughout the musical careers of the Allmans and the band's other members prior to and following its formation. The set was compiled by Bill Levenson (who had put together the Eric Clapton box set Crossroads the year before) and released to coincide with the band's 1989 reformation.

Track listing

Disc One
 "Shapes of Things" - The Allman Joys (Paul Samwell-Smith, Keith Relf, Jim McCarty) - 2:48
 "Spoonful" - The Allman Joys (Willie Dixon) - 3:40
 "Crossroads" - The Allman Joys (Robert Johnson) - 3:33
 "Cast Off All My Fears" - The Hour Glass (Jackson Browne) - 3:25
 "Down in Texas" — The Hour Glass (Eddie Hinton, Marlin Greene) - 3:07
 "Ain't No Good to Cry" — The Hour Glass (Al Anderson, Wildweeds) - 3:06
 "B.B. King Medley": "Sweet Little Angel"/"It's My Own Fault"/"How Blue Can You Get" - The Hour Glass (B.B. King, Jules Taub/John Lee Hooker/Mel London) - 7:06
 "Morning Dew" - The 31st Of February (Bonnie Dobson, Tim Rose) - 3:46
 "God Rest His Soul" — The 31st Of February (Steve Alaimo) - 3:56
 "I Feel Free" - The Second Coming (Jack Bruce, Pete Brown) - 3:31
 "She Has Funny Cars" — The Second Coming (Jorma Kaukonen, Marty Balin) - 4:48
 "Goin' Down Slow" - Duane Allman (Jimmy Oden) - 8:47
 "Dreams" (Demo) (Gregg Allman) - 4:55
 "Don't Want You No More" (Spencer Davis, Edward Hardin) - 2:25
 "It's Not My Cross to Bear" (Gregg Allman) - 4:56
 "Trouble No More" (McKinley Morganfield aka Muddy Waters) - 3:48
 "Dreams" (Gregg Allman) - 7:15

Disc Two
 "Statesboro Blues" (Blind Willie McTell) - 4:06
 "Hoochie Coochie Man" (Willie Dixon) - 4:57
 "Midnight Rider" (Gregg Allman, Robert Payne) - 2:58
 "Dimples" (Live) (John Lee Hooker, James Bracken) - 5:02
 "I'm Gonna Move to the Outskirts of Town" (Live) (William Weldon) - 9:23
 "Revival" (Dickey Betts) - 4:04
 "One More Ride" (Gregg Allman, Dickey Betts) - 2:41
 "Whipping Post" (Live) (Gregg Allman) - 22:53
 "In Memory of Elizabeth Reed" (Live) (Dickey Betts) - 12:58
 "Drunken Hearted Boy" (Live) (Elvin Bishop) - 6:54

Disc Three
 "You Don't Love Me"/"Soul Serenade" (Live) (Willie Cobbs/Curtis Ousley, Luther Dixon) - 19:28
 "Blue Sky" (Dickey Betts) - 5:10
 "Little Martha" (Duane Allman) - 2:13
 "Melissa" (Gregg Allman, Steve Alaimo) - 4:02
 "Ain't Wastin' Time No More" (Live) (Gregg Allman) - 4:46
 "Wasted Words" (Gregg Allman) - 4:21
 "Ramblin' Man" (Dickey Betts) - 4:48
 "Southbound" (Dickey Betts) - 5:10
 "Jessica" (Dickey Betts) - 7:30
 "Midnight Rider" - Gregg Allman (Gregg Allman) - 4:26
 "One Way Out" (Live) (Elmore James, Marshall Sehorn, Sonny Boy Williamson II) - 7:59
 "Long Time Gone" - Dickey Betts (Dickey Betts) - 4:30

Disc Four
 "Can't Lose What You Never Had" (McKinley Morganfield aka Muddy Waters) - 5:52
 "Come and Go Blues" - Gregg Allman (Gregg Allman) - 4:46
 "Bougainvillea" - Dickey Betts & Great Southern (Dickey Betts, Don Johnson) - 7:13
 "Can You Fool?" - Allman and Woman (Michael Smotherman) - 3:19
 "Good Time Feeling" - Dickey Betts & Great Southern (Dickey Betts) - 4:28
 "Crazy Love" (Dickey Betts) - 3:44
 "Can't Take it With You" (Dickey Betts, Don Johnson) - 3:34
 "Just Ain't Easy" (Live) (Gregg Allman) - 5:01
 "In Memory of Elizabeth Reed" (Live) (Dickey Betts) - 10:52
 "Angeline" (Dickey Betts, Mike Lawler, Johnny Cobb) - 3:40
 "Things You Used to Do" (Gregg Allman, Keith England) - 3:42
 "Nancy" — Dickey Betts (Dickey Betts, Jim Goff) - 3:51
 "Rain" - Gregg Allman (John Lennon, Paul McCartney) - 3:03
 "I'm No Angel" - Gregg Allman (Tony Colton, Phil Palmer) - 3:41
 "Demons" — Gregg Allman (Gregg Allman, Dan Toler, David Toler) - 3:28
 "Duane's Tune" - Dickey Betts (Dickey Betts) - 5:51

All songs performed by The Allman Brothers Band, unless otherwise noted.

Live Songs
Disc 2, Tracks 4-5 recorded 4/11/1970 at the Ludlow Garage in Cincinnati, OH
Disc 2, Tracks 8 recorded 3/12/1971 at the Fillmore East in New York, NY
Disc 2, Tracks 9-10 recorded 3/13/1971 at the Fillmore East in New York, NY
Disc 3, Track 1 recorded 8/26/1971 at A&R Studios in New York, NY
Disc 3, Track 5 recorded 4/2/1972 at the Mar Y Sol Festival in Vega Baja, Puerto Rico
Disc 3, Track 11 recorded 9/26/1973 at the Winterland in San Francisco, CA
Disc 4, Tracks 8-9 recorded 7/19/1979 at the Merriweather Post Pavilion in Columbia, MD

Notes

Personnel
 Adrian Barber - Producer
 Alan Facemire — Producer
 Allman and Woman — Performer
 Allman Joys - Performer
 Berry Oakley - Bass, Vocals
 Bill Levenson — Compilation, Liner Notes
 Bill Stewart - Drums
 Bob Keller — Bass, Harmonica, Vocals
 Bobbye Hall - Percussion
 Bonnie Bramlett - Vocals
 Bonnie MacLean — Photography
 Bruce Waibel - Bass
 Buck Rambo — Vocals
 Butch Trucks - Drums, Percussion, Tambourine, Tympani [Timpani]
 Charles May — Choir, Chorus
 Charles May Ensemble — Choir, Chorus
 Chaz Trippy — Percussion
 Cher - Vocals
 Chips Moman - Producer
 Chuck Leavell - Piano, Piano (Electric), Vocals
 Dallas Smith — Producer
 Dan Toler - Guitar, Guitar (Acoustic)
 David Brown - Bass
 David Frankie Toler - Drums, Percussion
 David Goldflies - Bass
 David Luell — Horn
 David Singer — Photography
 David Toler - Drums, Percussion
 David Walshaw — Drums, Percussion
 Dennis Drake — Digital Compilation, Engineer
 Dickey Betts - Dobro, Guitar, Guitar (Acoustic), Guitar (Electric), Performer, Producer, Slide Guitar, Vocals
 Dickey Betts Band - Producer
 Don Johnson - Vocals
 Don Tanner — Producer
 Donnie Sharbono — Drums, Percussion
 Dottie Rambo - Vocals
 Duane Allman - Dobro, Guitar, Guitar (Acoustic), Performer, Slide Guitar, Vocals
 Ed Freeman — Arranger, Conductor, Horn Arrangements, String Arrangements
 Elvin Bishop — Guitar, Vocals
 Fred Tackett - Guitar
 Great Southern — Performer
 Greg Calbi — Mastering
 Gregg Allman - Electric Guitar, Acoustic Guitar, (Rhythm), Organ (Hammond), Performer, Piano, Piano (Electric), Producer, Vocals
 Gregg Allman Band - Performer
 Harry Weinger — Editorial Assistant
 Helene Miles — Vocals
 Hilda Harris — Vocals
 Jack Richardson — Producer
 Jai Johanny Johanson - Conga, Drums
 Jerry McCoy — Bass
 Jerry Thompson — Drums, Percussion
 Jesse Willard Carr — Bass, Vocals
 Jim Essery — Harmonica
 John Hughey - Pedal steel guitar
 John Leslie Hug — Guitar
 John Meeks — Drums
 John Ryan — Producer
 John Swenson — Essay, Liner Notes
 Johnny Cobb — Keyboards, Piano, Producer
 Johnny Neel - Keyboards
 Johnny Sandlin — Bass, Drums, Percussion, Producer
 Jon Mathias — Producer
 Ken Tibbets - Bass
 Kirk West — Associate Producer
 Lamar Williams - Bass
 Lenny Waronker - Producer
 Les Dudek - Guitar, Guitar (Acoustic)
 Maretha Stewart — Vocals
 Marty Privette — Bass
 Matt Abts - Drums
 Maynard Portwood — Drums
 Michael Bays — Art Direction
 Michael Klotz — Design
 Michael Workman — Keyboards
 Mickey Raphael - Harmonica
 Mike Lawler - Keyboards, Piano (Electric), Producer
 Neil Larsen — Keyboards
 Nick DeCaro — Conductor, String Arrangements
 Pat Rizzo — Horn
 Paul Hornsby - Guitar, Keyboards, Organ, Piano, Vocals
 Pete Carr — Bass
 Reba Rambo — Vocals
 Reese Wynans - Organ
 Rick Hall - Producer
 Ricky Hirsch — Guitar
 Rodney Mills - Producer
 Russ Titelman - Producer
 Scott Boyer — Guitar, Guitar (Acoustic), Vocals
 Second Coming — Performer
 Stephen Miller — Piano
 Steve Alaimo - Producer
 Steve Beckmeier - Guitar
 Steve Madaio - Horn
 Steve Miller - Piano
 Stray Straton — Vocals
 The 31st Of February — Performer
 The Allman Brothers Band — Main Performer, Performer, Producer
 The Hour Glass — Performer
 Thom Doucette - Harmonica
 Tim Heding — Keyboards
 Timothy Eaton — Producer
 Tom Broome — Keyboards
 Tom Dowd- Producer
 Tommy Talton - Guitar (Acoustic)
 Warren Haynes - Guitar
 William Perkins — Executive Producer
 Willie Weeks - Bass

References

1989 compilation albums
The Allman Brothers Band compilation albums
Albums produced by Lenny Waronker
Mercury Records compilation albums